The 376th Aviation Regiment is an aviation regiment of the United States Army.

Structure

 1st Battalion (Security & Support) 
 Headquarters and Headquarters Company (NE ARNG)
 Company A (-) (UH-72A) (NE ARNG)
 Detachment 1 at Waterloo (IA ARNG)
 Detachment 2 at Davenport (IA ARNG)
 Detachment ? at Army Aviation Support Facility #1 at Lincoln Airport (NE ARNG).
 Company B at Jefferson City (MO ARNG)
Detachment 1 at Decatur (IL ARNG)
 Company C (-)(KY ARNG)
 Detachment 1 (IN ARNG)
 Company D (Air Ambulance)(-)(NE ARNG)

References

376